Leoš Janáček wrote two string quartets. String Quartet No. 1, "Kreutzer Sonata", was written in a very short space of time, between 13 and 28 October 1923, at a time of great creative concentration. The work was revised by the composer in the autograph from 30 October to 7 November 1923.

The composition was inspired by Leo Tolstoy's novella The Kreutzer Sonata.  (The novella was in turn inspired by Beethoven's Violin Sonata No. 9, known as the "Kreutzer Sonata" from the name of its dedicatee, Rodolphe Kreutzer.)

The première of the Quartet was given on 17 October 1924 by the Czech Quartet at a concert of the Spolek pro moderní hudbu (Contemporary Music Society) at the Mozarteum in Prague.  A pocket score of the work was published in April 1925 by Hudební matice.

Janáček also used the Tolstoy novel in 1908–1909, when it inspired him to compose a Piano Trio in three movements, now lost.  Surviving fragments of the Trio suggest that it was quite similar to the surviving quartet, and reconstructions as a piano trio have been performed.

Background 
The "Kreutzer Sonata" quartet was the first to be composed after a request from the Bohemian Quartet who, in 1923, requested Janáček to compose two string quartets for them.  The second was the "Intimate Letters" quartet.

Structure and style 
"I was imagining a poor woman, tormented and run down, just like the one the Russian writer Tolstoy describes in his Kreutzer Sonata", Janáček confided in one of his letters to his young friend Kamila Stösslová. In the music of the quartet is depicted psychological drama containing moments of conflict as well as emotional outbursts, passionate work rush towards catharsis and to final climax.

The composition consists of four parts:
 Adagio – Con moto
 Con moto
 Con moto – Vivo – Andante
 Con moto – (Adagio) – Più mosso

The thematic idea central to the whole work is very similar to the theme of the composer's Danube symphony (1923–25). Using a principle of thematic montage, the quartet almost abandons the fields of traditional harmony, homophony and counterpoint and instead makes free with the varied sonic factors typical of Janáček, including his characteristic modal inflections.

References 

Janáček, Leoš: String Quartet No. 1. Urtext. Praha: Editio Bärenreiter, 2000. TP 520

Arrangements
 Arrangement suitable for: two violins, viola and cello
 arrangement for: soundtrack of the film Le Paltoquet
 arrangement by: Quentin Damamme
 performed by: Viotti Quartet
 Arrangement suitable for: two violins, viola and cello
 arrangement for: string orchestra
 arrangement by: Richard Tognetti
 performed by: Australian Chamber Orchestra, co  Richard Tognetti
 Arrangement suitable for: two violins, viola and cello
 arrangement for: string orchestra
 arrangement by: Mario Brunello
 performed by: Orchestra d’Archi Italiana, co  Mario Brunello
 Arrangement suitable for: two violins, viola and cello
 arrangement for: piano trio
 arrangement by: Michal Hájků, (pseudonym of Jarmil Burghauser)
 performed by: Abegg Trio
 Arrangement suitable for: two violins, viola and cello
 arrangement for: 
 arrangement by: Till Alexander Körber
 performed by: Merlin Ensemble
 Arrangement suitable for: two violins, viola and cello
 arrangement for: piano trio
 arrangement by: Stephen Coxe
 performed by: Weilerstein Trio

External links 

 Program notes
 Recording by the Huberman Quartet (archived on the Wayback Machine)

Chamber music by Leoš Janáček
Janacek 1
1923 compositions